Colby Mountain is a summit in Tuolumne County, California, in the United States.

Colby Mountain was named for William Edward Colby, first Secretary of the Sierra Club.

References

Mountains of Tuolumne County, California
Mountains of Northern California